Saint-Michel-le-Cloucq is a commune in the Vendée department in the Pays de la Loire region in western France.

See also
Communes of the Vendée department

References

Communes of Vendée
Vendée communes articles needing translation from French Wikipedia